Willard Chapin Bailey (July 27, 1843 – February 22, 1915) served in the California State Senate for the 32nd district from 1891 to 1895. He served in the Union Army with Company F, 40th Wisconsin Infantry Regiment as a corporal during the American Civil War.

He also was city manager of San Jose, California.

References

External links
Join California W. C. Bailey

1843 births
1915 deaths
Union Army non-commissioned officers
Politicians from San Jose, California
Republican Party California state senators
19th-century American politicians